Horace Grangel (23 November 1908 – 14 May 1970) was an Australian cricketer. He played one first-class cricket match for Victoria in 1936.

See also
 List of Victoria first-class cricketers

References

External links
 

1908 births
1970 deaths
Australian cricketers
Victoria cricketers
Cricketers from Sydney